The American Association for Marriage and Family Therapy (AAMFT) is a professional association in the field of marriage and family therapy representing more than 50,000 marriage and family therapists throughout the United States, Canada, and abroad.

History

Founded in 1942 as the American Association of Marriage Counselors, the AAMFT has been involved with the problems, needs and changing patterns of couples and family relationships. A central premise of AAMFT is that marriage and family therapists should treat relationships within families rather than the symptoms of individuals based on a view that individuals are part of relationship systems.

Goals

The association focuses on increasing understanding, research and education in the field of marriage and family therapy.

Goals of AAMFT are to:

 facilitate research, theory development and education,
 establish and implement standards for programs that serve as the basis for accreditation,
 establish implement standards for clinical supervision, professional ethics and the clinical practice of marriage and family therapy.
 serve as a recognized accreditor in North America for the accreditation of MFT academic programs in the United States and Canada.

Continuing Education

The AAMFT conducts an annual national conference in the United States each fall as well as a week-long series of continuing education institutes in the summer and winter.

Accreditation of Academic Programs

AAMFT's "is the nationally recognized accrediting agency that accredits Master's degree, doctoral degree, and post-graduate degree clinical training programs in marriage and family therapy throughout the United States and Canada."

Licensing of Marriage and Family Therapists

Within the United States, marriage and family therapy is regulated by individual states.

Marriage and Family Therapy Journals 
 Contemporary Family Therapy
 Family Process
 Family Relations
 Journal of Child and Family Studies,  (Print)  (Online), Springer
 Journal of Family Psychology
 Journal of Marital and Family Therapy

References

External links 
American Association for Marriage and Family Therapy – Internet Archive. Archived from the official website   
TherapistLocator.net - a website of the American Association for Marriage and Family Therapy with a listing of over 15,000 marriage and family therapists

Counseling organizations
Family therapy
Professional associations based in the United States
Relationship counseling
School accreditors
Organizations established in 1942
1942 establishments in the United States